Italy competed at the 2014 European Athletics Championships in Zürich, Switzerland, between 12 and 17 August 2014. A delegation of 78 athletes were sent to represent the country.

Medalists

Top eight

Men

Women

References

External links
 EAA official site

Nations at the 2014 European Athletics Championships
2014
European Athletics Championships